Dondi Enos Costin (born August 21, 1964) is a former major general in the United States Air Force. He has led the United States Air Force Chaplain Corps and served as Chief of Chaplains of the United States Air Force since August 30, 2015. He retired effective September 1, 2018, having accepted the position of president of Charleston Southern University earlier that year.

Education
Chaplain Costin is a native of Wilmington, North Carolina, and was commissioned a second lieutenant upon graduation from the United States Air Force Academy in 1986. He received his Masters of Divinity from Southwestern Baptist Theological Seminary, Fort Worth, Texas. He also holds Doctor of Ministry and Doctor of Philosophy degrees from the Southern Baptist Theological Seminary, Louisville, Kentucky, as well as a Master of Arts in counseling from Liberty University.
His military education includes U.S. Air Force Academic Instructor School, Squadron Officer School, Air War College, and Master of Strategic Studies.

Early life and education

Costin served as a squadron-level scientific analyst evaluating air-to-ground precision guided munitions, chief of scientific analysis on a major command headquarters staff, and assistant professor of aerospace studies.  He completed a competitive category transfer into the Air Force Chaplain Corps in 1996.

Career
Costin has since served as Protestant chaplain for Air Force Basic Military Training, flight line chaplain and then senior flight line chaplain for both special operations and conventional forces in Europe, senior Protestant chaplain, readiness instructor/ evaluator preparing Chaplain Corps personnel for worldwide deployment, Air Staff branch chief, wing chaplain, command chaplain for the air component mission in Southwest Asia, and command chaplain for Pacific Air Forces.  An ordained Southern Baptist minister, Costin is endorsed by the Liberty Baptist Fellowship to serve as an Air Force Chaplain. He was double promoted from the rank of colonel to major general to assume the position of Chief of Chaplains in August 2015.

Awards and decorations

References

External links

Living people
1964 births
People from Wilmington, North Carolina
Southern Baptists
United States Air Force Academy alumni
Southwestern Baptist Theological Seminary alumni
United States Air Force chaplains
Southern Baptist Theological Seminary alumni
Liberty University alumni
United States Air Force generals
Baptists from North Carolina